Keith Johnson (born April 17, 1971) is an American former professional baseball infielder and current coach. Johnson played one season in Major League Baseball (MLB), with the Anaheim Angels. Since his playing career, he has continued to work in baseball as a coach and manager. He is currently the manager of the Salt Lake Bees.

Biography
Johnson played professionally from 1992 though 2003 as an infielder, primarily for the Los Angeles Dodgers organization. He first reached the Triple-A level in 1996. In 12 minor league season, he appeared in 1265 games while compiling a .264 batting average with 118 home runs and 600 runs batted in (RBIs). Johnson played six games in MLB, all for the 2000 Anaheim Angels, batting 2-for-4 (.500).

Johnson became a minor-league manager in the farm system of the Los Angeles Angels in 2008, when he was named skipper of the Cedar Rapids Kernels of the Class A Midwest League. The following two seasons, Johnson managed the Rancho Cucamonga Quakes of the Class A California League, winning the 2010 league championship, before his promotion to manager of the 2011 Salt Lake Bees of the Triple-A Pacific Coast League on December 7, 2010. Johnson worked in Salt Lake until 2015, when he was promoted to a minor league scout for the Angels while Dave Anderson took over his managing duties for the year. After the 2015 season, Johnson returned to his managerial duties in Salt Lake. In August 2018, the Angels promoted him to their major league staff as an infield coach; Eric Chavez succeeded him as manager of the Bees.

Johnson was named as manager for the Triple-A New Orleans Baby Cakes of the Miami Marlins organization for the 2019 season. He was named first base coach of the major-league Marlins prior to the 2021 season.

On February 16, 2023 it was announced that Johnson would return to the Salt Lake Bees for a third stint as manager.

References

External links

1971 births
Living people
Albuquerque Dukes players
American expatriate baseball players in Canada
Anaheim Angels players
Bakersfield Dodgers players
Baseball players from California
Edmonton Trappers players
El Paso Diablos players
Las Vegas 51s players
Major League Baseball infielders
Major League Baseball coaches
Minor league baseball managers
New Orleans Baby Cakes
Pacific Tigers baseball players
Salt Lake Bees
Salt Lake Stingers players
San Bernardino Spirit players
San Antonio Missions players
Tucson Sidewinders players
Vero Beach Dodgers players
Yakima Bears players
Los Angeles Angels coaches